Ray Rogers is a retired American archer. He won the world championships in 1967, both individually and in the team competition, and set several world records in 1967 and 1968. He retired soon after winning a national title in 1969, before archery was reintroduced to the Olympic Games in 1972. In 2007 he was inducted to the Oklahoma State Archery Association Hall of Fame.

References

Living people
American male archers
Sportspeople from Oklahoma
World Archery Championships medalists
Year of birth missing (living people)